Beebe Hill State Forest is a state forest in the town of Austerlitz, Columbia County, New York, United States. Compromising  in the Taconic Mountains, it adjoins Harvey Mountain State Forest to the southeast. The  Barrett Pond is located within the state forest on the west side of Columbia County Route 5, and was home to numerous fish species when last sampled in 1983. 

Initially constructed in 1928 on Alander Mountain in Massachusetts, the tower was moved to Washburn Mountain in Columbia County in 1933, and finally to Beebe Hill in 1964. It remained in operation until 1987. In 1997, local residents, the Forest Fire Lookout Association, and the New York State Department of Environmental Conservation began efforts to restore the fire tower and establish access through a network of hiking trails. Along the main trail near the fire tower, a lean-to shelter is available for public use.

References

External links
  Trail guide and photographs. 

New York (state) state forests
Protected areas of Columbia County, New York